Legend is a compilation album by Bob Marley and the Wailers. It was released in May 1984 by Island Records. It is a greatest hits collection of singles in its original vinyl format and is the best-selling reggae album of all-time, with over 12 million sold in the US, over 3.3 million in the UK (where it is the seventeenth best-selling album) and an estimated 25 million copies sold globally. In 2003, the album was ranked number 46 in Rolling Stone magazine's list of the "500 Greatest Albums of All Time", maintaining the ranking in a 2012 revised list, but dropping to number 48 in the 2020 revised list.

As of 14 March 2023, Legend has spent a total of 773 nonconsecutive weeks on the US Billboard 200 albums chart—the second longest run in history. Also, as of 10 March 2023, it has spent 1,072 weeks in the top 100 of the UK Albums Chart—the third longest run in the chart's history.

Content
The album contains all ten of Bob Marley's Top 40 hit singles in the UK up to the time, plus three songs from the original Wailers with Peter Tosh and Bunny Livingston in "Stir It Up," "I Shot the Sheriff," and "Get Up, Stand Up," along with the closing song from the album Uprising, "Redemption Song." Of the original tracks, only four date from prior to the Exodus album.

The cassette tape release of the album featured two extra songs, "Punky Reggae Party," the B-side to the "Jamming" single, and "Easy Skanking" from the Kaya album. A second generation compact disc remastered by Barry Diament appeared in 1990 on the Tuff Gong label. Although the disc includes the same 14 songs, the tracks are in their original album lengths rather than the edited versions for single release.

On 12 February 2002, the expanded 14-track edition with songs at album lengths were remastered for compact disc with a bonus disc consisting of 1984-vintage remixes for extended dance club singles and dub versions. In 2004, the Legend double-disc deluxe edition was reissued with the music DVD of the same name in the sound + vision deluxe edition. In 2010, Legend was made available as downloadable content for Rock Band. However, it was released without "Get Up, Stand Up", which was later included on Rock Band 3. In June 2012, a high fidelity audiophile version of the album was released on HDtracks in 96 kHz/24bit and 192 kHz/24bit resolutions.

Reception

Legend has peaked at number 5 on the Billboard 200, making it Marley's highest-charting album in the US. It also holds the distinction of being the second longest-charting album in the history of Billboard magazine. Combining its chart life on the Billboard 200 and the Billboard Catalog Albums charts, Legend has had a chart run of 2165 nonconsecutive weeks, surpassed only by Pink Floyd's The Dark Side of the Moon at 2166 nonconsecutive weeks. As of the Billboard issue dated 18 March 2023, the album has charted on the Billboard 200 for 773 nonconsecutive weeks. As of December 2017, Legend has sold 12.3 million copies in the US since 1991 when SoundScan started tracking album sales, making it the ninth best-selling album of the Nielsen SoundScan era. The RIAA has certified Legend for selling 15 million copies, a total that includes purchases before 1991.

In the United Kingdom, Legend has been certified 13× Platinum, and is the 16th best-selling album in that country of all time, with sales of over 3,380,000 as of July 2016.

As of April 2012, the album has sold more than 25 million copies worldwide.

Despite its generally positive reception, Legend has been criticized for being a deliberately inoffensive selection of Marley's less political music, shorn of any radicalism that might damage sales. In 2014 in the Phoenix New Times, David Accomazzo wrote "Dave Robinson, who constructed the tracklist for Legend, [said that] the tracklist for Legend deliberately was designed to appeal to white audiences. Island Records had viewed Marley as a political revolutionary, and Robinson saw this perspective as damaging to Marley's bottom line. So he constructed a greatest-hits album that showed just one face of the Marley prism, the side he deemed most sellable to the suburbs. [...] If you're looking for mass-market appeal to secular-progressive America, you don't include songs that invoke collective guilt over the slave trade, nor do you address the inconvenient truth that the bucolic Jamaican lifestyle of reggae, sandy beaches, and marijuana embraced by millions of college freshmen, exists only because of the brutal slave trade. [...] the songs on Legend offer just a brief glimpse into his music. The definitive album of the most important reggae singer of all time is a hodgepodge collection of love songs, feel-good sentiment, and mere hints of the fiery activist whose politics drew bullets in the '70s." Vivien Goldman wrote in 2015, "when he does get played on the radio now, it's the mellow songs, not the angry songs, that get heard – the ones that have been compiled on albums such as Legend."

Track listings
When first released in the US in 1984, pressings contained remixes of "No Woman, No Cry," "Buffalo Soldier," "Waiting In Vain," "Exodus" and "Jammin'," done in 1984 by Eric Thorngren. (International pressings substituted the remixes for either album versions or 7" edits.) Two versions of the CD were released in Europe in 1984; one used the same mastering as the US pressing, the other (mastered by Barry Diament) used original full length versions for all the tracks. Pressings from 1986 on used the international version of the release until 2002, when a two-disc deluxe version released by Universal replaced all tracks with their respective album versions (except for "No Woman, No Cry," which is the full length version from the "Live!" album) and included the two extra tracks from the cassette release as bonus tracks. That version was released individually as part of "The Definitive Remasters" series. When track No. 13 [Exodus, released on the album "Exodus" by Bob Marley & The Wailers in 1977 by Tuff Gong/Island] begins, the noise at the ending of Bob Marley's "Satisfy My Soul" [released on the album "Kaya" by Bob Marley & The Wailers in 1978 by Tuff Gong/Island] plays at the start.

Original 1984 US album

Original compact disc version

2002 Deluxe edition

Legend: Remixed (2013)

30th anniversary edition (2014)
In celebration of the 30th anniversary, the compilation was re-released (as its "The Definitive Remasters" form) in two formats:
A tri-color (red, yellow, green) double 180g vinyl set
A CD/Blu-ray 5.1 audio set; the Blu-ray disc contains the studio version of "No Woman, No Cry" and previously unheard alternate takes of "Easy Skanking" and "Punky Reggae Party."

Charts

Weekly charts

Year-end charts

Decade-end charts

Certifications

Album

Video

See also
 List of best-selling albums
 List of best-selling albums in France
 List of best-selling albums in New Zealand
 List of best-selling albums in the United Kingdom
 List of best-selling albums in the United States

References

1984 greatest hits albums
Bob Marley and the Wailers compilation albums
Island Records compilation albums
Reggae albums by Jamaican artists
Tuff Gong albums
Albums produced by Chris Blackwell